Chekunov is a surname. Notable people with the surname include:

Andrei Chekunov (born 1966), Georgian football official and player
Vladimir Chekunov (born 1983), Russian footballer

See also
Chekanov

Russian-language surnames